Jack Elton Bresenham (born 11 October 1937, Clovis, New Mexico, US) is a former professor of computer science.

Biography
Bresenham retired from 27 years of service at IBM as a Senior Technical Staff Member in 1987. He taught for 16 years at Winthrop University and has nine patents. He has four children: Janet, Craig, Linda, and David.

Bresenham's line algorithm, developed in 1962, is his most well-known innovation. It determines which points on a 2-dimensional raster should be plotted in order to form a straight line between two given points, and is commonly used to draw lines on a computer screen.  It is one of the earliest algorithms discovered in the field of computer graphics.  The midpoint circle algorithm shares some similarities to his line algorithm and is known as Bresenham's circle algorithm.

 Ph.D., Stanford University, 1964
 MSIE, Stanford University, 1960
 BSEE, University of New Mexico, 1959

See also
 List of computer scientists
 Bresenham's line algorithm

References

External links
 DADS entry on Bresenham's algorithm

1937 births
Living people
American computer scientists
IBM employees
Stanford University alumni
University of New Mexico alumni
People from Clovis, New Mexico